The Baldwin RS-4-TC  is a diesel-electric locomotive (switcher) built by the Baldwin-Lima-Hamilton Corporation between July 1953 and January 1955.

History

The RS-4-TCs were originally built with Caterpillar D397 diesel engines. The Caterpillar D397s were chosen for their high speed and small bore and stroke for quick startup and shutdowns. There are two number systems for the RS-4-TCs, the 1200 series or the 4000 series. The locomotives in both series were the same, except the 1200s were built for domestic service and had fixed axle, standard gauge trucks while the 4000s were built for foreign service and had adjustable-gauge trucks for use on foreign narrow and wide gauge tracks. Even though the 4000s were built for foreign service, very few were actually deployed overseas, the vast majority served in the United States.

At the end of the Korean War, most RS-4-TCs were placed into storage while their World War II counterparts were sold as surplus. Today, the majority of RS-4-TCs have been sold as surplus and are currently serving tourist and shortline railroads with a few still in military service.

In the 1980s, many RS-4-TCs were rebuilt by railroad contractors into RS-4-TC 1A locomotives. The rebuilding included replacing the CAT D397 diesel engines with CAT 3508 engines rated at 500 HP, replacing the adjustable-gauge trucks with non adjustable trucks, and replacing the electrical control system with an EMD system and control stand. These are identifiable from the exterior by a single exhaust stack near the rear of the hood rather than two small stacks towards the front.

Technical details
The diesel engine is a twelve-cylinder, turbocharged, water-cooled, four-cycle, V-type engine used
to provide power. It is directly connected to the main generator. The traction motors are axle hung and supported on the truck transoms by spring-loaded suspension. One motor is geared to each axle through a single set of gears with a ratio of 14:72. The radiator keeps the engine at a proper operating temperature between 100 and 198F (37.7 and 92.2 °C). Two externally mounted battery boxes, one on each side of the locomotive, provide ventilated compartments to house the eight batteries. Two main reservoir tanks, one on each side of the locomotive, provide a means of storing air for the air system. The main generator furnishes direct-current power over a wide range of voltage at various
speeds up to 1200 rpm. It is separately excited by the exciter generator mounted on the generator frame. The generator also acts as a starting motor when the start button is pushed and the battery switch is closed. The fuel tank can hold 500 gallons (1892 liters) of diesel fuel for engine operation. Two fill pipes and two sight glasses, one on each side of the locomotive, provide a means of filling the tank and monitoring the level of fuel. The blower provides forced ventilation for the traction motors which require adequate cooling. It is belt-driven from the main generator shaft.

The master controller contains the throttle, reverser, brake controls, and other controls
and indicators used by operator to operate and monitor the locomotive and is located in the cab of the locomotive. The equipment cabinet contains the automatic switching relays and
contactors and is located in the cab of the locomotive. Both high and low voltage are present in the electrical equipment cabinet when the locomotive is in operation.

Name Designation
RS - Road Switching Service 
4  - 4th military type 
TC - Transportation Corps (as in Army Transportation Corps)

Original buyers

Gallery

References

External links

 Baldwin RS-4-TC Roster
 RS-4-TC 60-Ton Locomotives

Diesel-electric locomotives of the United States
B-B locomotives
Baldwin locomotives
Railway locomotives introduced in 1953
Standard gauge locomotives of the United States
United States Army locomotives